CBC News Network (sometimes listed in program guides under its former title CBC News Now) is the self-named rolling news program on CBC News Network. The show is broadcast weekdays from 10 a.m. to 4 p.m. ET, Saturdays from 6 a.m. to 5:30 p.m. ET and Sundays from 6 a.m. to 4 p.m. ET (two-hour break at 10 a.m. ET) with additional evening broadcasts on weekdays (discussed below). On Saturdays additional live editions air at the 6, 9 and 11 p.m. half-hours. Aarti Pole is the main host of these editions.

The show covers national and international news live throughout the day, featuring breaking news, interviews and guest analysis. The show also has business and sports updates every hour, as well as weather information provided by The Weather Network. The daytime broadcasts are produced at the Canadian Broadcasting Centre in Toronto.

Simulcast on CBC Television stations
A simulcast of the rolling coverage is broadcast on all CBC Television stations from noon to 1 p.m. local time (also from 6 to 7 a.m. in regions where a local CBC Radio One morning show is not simulcast instead).

Evening editions
Primetime airings of the program on weeknights, produced at the CBC Regional Broadcast Centre Vancouver and hosted by Ian Hanomansing, were added in fall 2012 as a replacement for Connect with Mark Kelley, a more resource-intensive program which had been cancelled due to CBC budget cuts, and for the weekday airings of The Passionate Eye. There are three such broadcasts each weeknight, during the 8 p.m., 10 p.m., and 1 a.m. hours (all times Eastern).

These editions are similar in format to the daytime airings but primarily feature Vancouver-based reporters including Sarah Galashan and Johanna Wagstaffe. For the first several months, the final two minutes of each evening edition was devoted to a quick-cut montage of the day's events titled "The Edit", which appeared to be patterned after CBS This Morning's opening montage, the "Eye Opener"; this segment was abandoned by mid-2013.

On October 9, 2017, host Sarah Galashan announced that the Vancouver edition of CBC News Network would have its final show on October 13, at 8 PM Eastern time.  This segment was replaced by a two hour edition of CBC News Network airing at 7 PM eastern time, and hosted by Carole MacNeil from Toronto.  This segment began on October 16, 2017.

Notable hosts

From Toronto
 Heather Hiscox (Weekdays 6am-10am)
 Suhana Meharchand (Weekdays 10am-1pm)
 Carole MacNeil (Weeknights 7pm-9pm)
Andrew Nichols (Weekdays 1pm-5pm)
John Northcott (Weekends 6am-11am)
Aarti Pole (Saturday 4pm-5pm, 6pm, 9pm, 11pm)
Michael Serapio (Sunday 11:30am–4:30pm)
 Diana Swain
Hannah Thibedeau
Reshmi Nair
Natasha Fatah
Jennifer Hall

From Vancouver

Sarah Galashan 
Ian Hanomansing

External links
 CBC News Now

CBC News Network original programming
CBC Television original programming
CBC News
Television shows filmed in Toronto
2000 Canadian television series debuts
2000s Canadian television news shows
2010s Canadian television news shows
2020s Canadian television news shows
Television news program articles using incorrect naming style